Aldo Bushi (born 22 April 2001) is an Albanian footballer who plays as a goalkeeper for KF Oriku in the Kategoria e Dytë.

Career

Flamurtari
After spending several years in the club's youth academy, Bushi made his debut in official competition for the club on 18 July 2020, tallying 81 minutes in a 2-0 away defeat to KF Tirana.

References

External links
Aldo Bushi at Sofa Score

2001 births
Living people
Flamurtari Vlorë players
KF Oriku players
Kategoria Superiore players
Kategoria e Dytë players
Albanian footballers
Association football goalkeepers